Royal Enfield is an Indian multinational motorcycle manufacturing company headquartered in Chennai, Tamil Nadu, India. The Royal Enfield brand, including its original English heritage, is the oldest global motorcycle brand in continuous production. The company operates manufacturing plants in Chennai in India.

The first Royal Enfield motorcycle was built in 1901 by The Enfield Cycle Company of Redditch, Worcestershire, England, which was responsible for the design and original production of the Royal Enfield Bullet, the longest-lived motorcycle design in history. Licensed from the original English Royal Enfield by the indigenous Indian Madras Motors, the company is now a subsidiary of Eicher Motors, an Indian automaker. The company makes classic-looking motorcycles including the Royal Enfield Bullet, Classic 350, Royal Enfield Thunderbird, Meteor 350, Classic 500, Interceptor 650, Continental and many more. Royal Enfield also make adventurous and offroading motorcycles like Royal Enfield Himalayan. Their motorcycles are equipped with single-cylinder and twin-cylinder engines.

History

After the Indian Independence Act 1947 the new government looked for a suitable motorcycle for its army to patrol the country's border. In 1952 the Royal Enfield Bullet was chosen as the most suitable bike for the job. In 1954, the government ordered 800 in units of the 350 cc model. In 1955, the Redditch company partnered with Madras Motors in India to form 'Enfield India' to assemble, under licence, the 350 cc Royal Enfield Bullet motorcycle in Madras (now called Chennai). The tooling was sold to Enfield India so that they could manufacture components. By 1962, all components were made in India. The Indian Enfield uses the 1960 engine (with metric bearing sizes), Royal Enfield still makes an essentially similar bike in the 350 cc and 500 cc models, along with several different models for different market segments.

In 1990, Royal Enfield collaborated with the Eicher Group, an automotive company in India, and merged with it in 1994. Apart from bikes, Eicher Group is involved in the production and sales of commercial vehicles and automotive gears. Although Royal Enfield experienced difficulties in the 1990s, and ceased motorcycle production at their Jaipur factory in 2002, by 2013 the company opened a new primary factory in the Chennai suburb of Oragadam on the strength of increased demand for its motorcycles. This was followed in 2017 by the inauguration of another new factory of a similar size to the facility at Oragadam (capacity 600,000 vehicles per year) at Vallam Vadagal. The original factory at Tiruvottiyur became secondary, and continues to produce some limited-run motorcycle models.

Flooding, produced by the heaviest rainfall in Chennai in over a century, caused Royal Enfield to cut production by 4,000 motorcycles in November 2015, followed by a shutdown of the plants in Thiruvottiyur and Oragadam on 1 December, as well as the company offices in Chennai. Production resumed at 50% capacity on 7 December and operations at both plants were back to normal on 14 December.

Royal Enfield announced its first takeover of another company in May, 2015 with the purchase of a UK motorcycle design and manufacturing firm, Harris Performance Products, that had previously developed the chassis of the Royal Enfield Continental GT Cafe Racer. Harris work with the UK-based part of Royal Enfield's development team, who are based at the UK Technology Centre at Bruntingthorpe Proving Ground in Leicestershire. The team was established in January 2015, and moved into their new, purpose-built facility in May 2017. By the end of 2019, the team numbered 155 and carries out the full spectrum of design and development activities, from concept generation and clay design to engineering design, prototyping and validation.

Royal Enfield currently sells motorcycles in more than 50 countries. Royal Enfield surpassed Harley-Davidson in global sales in 2015.

In August 2015, Royal Enfield Motors announced it is establishing its North American headquarters and a dealership in Milwaukee, Wisconsin, with the intention to offer three bikes, the Bullet 500, Classic 500 and Continental GT 535 Cafe Racer as they feel this engine size represents an under-served market. The dealership will be Royal Enfield's first company-owned store in the U.S., according to Rod Copes, president of Royal Enfield North America. The company wants to establish about 100 dealerships in American cities starting with Milwaukee.

Later in August 2015, parent-business Eicher announced its entry in Indonesia as a part of its global strategy in the mid-sized (250–750 cc) motorcycle segment, initially starting retail operations from a dealership in Jakarta. From April to September, 2015, Royal Enfield's domestic sales were 50% higher than the previous year, despite a declining motorcycle market in India.

Interceptor and Continental GT

Royal Enfield unveiled a 650 cc twin-cylinder engine at their Technology Centre, Harris Performance Products, in Leicestershire, England, in November 2017 to power a new generation of Royal Enfield motorcycles. It was showcased at the Milan Motorcycle Show on 7 November 2017 in Italy, where two motorcycles based on the engine, the Interceptor 650 and Continental GT 650 were revealed. Both models were introduced to the US market in November 2018 to positive reviews. The Interceptor is marketed as the INT650 in the United States where Honda has a trademark on the Interceptor name. During the years 2020–2021, the 650cc twins were the best-selling motorcycles in Great Britain.

2020 Meteor 350

Royal Enfield launched a new lineup of cruiser motorcycles on 6 November 2020. It replaced the Thunderbird 350 and 350X series which were discontinued earlier that year. It uses a 349 cc single cylinder engine featuring a single overhead camshaft system (SOHC), and a completely new engine with fewer moving parts than the 346 cc of the Classic 350. It is the first Royal Enfield to offer the Tripper Navigation system.

Manufacturing plants
 Thiruvottiyur, Chennai, Tamil Nadu, India
 Oragadam Industrial Corridor, Oragadam, Chennai, Tamil Nadu, India
 SIPCOT Industrial Park, Vallam Vadagal, Chennai, Tamil Nadu, India

See also
List of Royal Enfield motorcycles

References

Further reading

External links

Official website

Royal Enfield Motors
Motorcycle manufacturers of India
Manufacturing companies based in Chennai
Vehicle manufacturing companies established in 1955
Indian brands
Indian companies established in 1955
1955 establishments in Madras State